This is a summary of the electoral history of Shehbaz Sharif, who was Chief Minister of Punjab from 1997 to 1999 and again from 2008 to 2013 and then again from 2013 to 2018 and Leader of the Pakistan Muslim League (N) from 2009 to 2011 and again from 2018 to present date. He was a member of the Provincial Assembly of the Punjab and National Assembly of Pakistan (MNA) for Lahore.

References

Shehbaz Sharif
Sharif, Shehbaz